Studtite, chemical formula [(UO2)O2(H2O)2]·2(H2O) or UO4·4(H2O), is a secondary uranium mineral containing peroxide formed by the alpha-radiolysis of water during formation. It occurs as pale yellow to white needle-like crystals often in acicular, white sprays.

Studtite was originally described by Vaes in 1947 from specimens from Shinkolobwe, Katanga Copper Crescent, Katanga (Shaba), Democratic Republic of Congo, and has since been reported from several other localities. The mineral was named for Franz Edward Studt, an English prospector and geologist who was working for the Belgians.

When exposed to air studtite converts over a short time to the metastudtite UO4·2(H2O) form. Despite their apparent chemical simplicity, these two uranyl species are the only reported peroxide minerals.

They may also be readily formed on the surface of nuclear waste under long-term storage and have been found on the surface of spent nuclear fuel stored at the Hanford, Washington nuclear site.  It has also been reported that studtite has since formed on the corium lavas that were created during the course of the Chernobyl nuclear plant accident.  Thus, there is considerable evidence that uranyl peroxides such as studtite and metastudtite will be important alteration phases of nuclear waste, possibly at the expense of other minerals, such as uranyl oxides and silicates, which have been more thoroughly studied and are better understood. The formation of these minerals may impact the long-term performance of deep geological repository sites such as Yucca Mountain nuclear waste repository. Due to insufficient information about these minerals it is unknown if they will make radioactive wastes more or less stable, but the presence of studtite and metastudtite provides a pathway for mobilizing insoluble U(IV) from the corroding fuel surface into soluble uranyl species.

References

Uranium(VI) minerals
Oxide minerals
Radioactive waste
Monoclinic minerals
Minerals in space group 12